Geranium himalayense (common names Himalayan crane's-bill or lilac cranesbill) is a species of hardy flowering herbaceous perennial plant in the genus Geranium, family Geraniaceae. It is native to West Himalaya, Afghanistan, Kyrgyzstan, Nepal, Pakistan, Tajikistan, Tibet, and Uzbekistan.

It has a  sprawling habit, violet-blue flowers and deeply cut palmate foliage. It grows in alpine and subalpine meadows.

References

himalayense
Flora of Central Asia
Flora of West Himalaya
Flora of China
Plants described in 1862